British high-tech architecture is a form of high-tech architecture, also known as structural expressionism, a type of late modern architectural style that emerged in the 1970s, incorporating elements of high tech industry and technology into building design. High-tech architecture grew from the modernist style, using new advances in technology and building materials.

Clarification
British high-tech architecture is a term applied principally to the work of a group of London-based architects, British High-Tech Architects, who, by following the teachings of the Architectural Association's futuristic programmes, created an architectural style best characterised by cultural and design ideals of: component-based, light weight, easily transportable, factory-finished using standardised interchangeable highly engineered parts, fun, popular and spontaneous Pop-up buildings.

Within the Architectural Association were a number of overlapping spheres of influence – the most notable being Archigram, a loosely arranged group including Peter Cook (responsible for Plug-in City and Instant City), Mike Webb (Sin Centre) and Ron Herron (Walking City). Alongside Archigram were the mechanistic schemes of Cedric Price, who, with engineer Frank Newby, designed a number of unbuilt projects, most notably Fun Palace, a community theatre to the brief of Joan Littlewood, and Potteries Think-belt, a scheme which would re-use decommissioned railway routes to create a university on wheels. Price also promoted the idea of architecture having a fourth dimension: Time. In addition to the aforementioned was the Independent Group (art movement), which influenced the British side of the pop art movement, through architectural luminaries Peter Smithson a Head of the Architectural Association and Colin St John Wilson.

The British high-tech movement remained in the ascendency from the 1960s until 1984, when an intervention by HRH Charles Prince of Wales over a competition-winning design by ABK Architects (previously Ahrends, Burton and Koralek) for an extension to the National Gallery in London signalled an end to High Tech architecture in the UK. More, from that date, the group of leading proponents of British High Tech architecture distanced themselves from the High Tech style to endear themselves to sponsors. By such action, they would continue to design buildings of national and international significance. In satisfying the demands of conservative clients, planners, conservationists and funding organisations, the essence of High Tech was lost.

This article, British high-tech architecture, traces the development of technological advances and industrial innovations that went hand-in-hand with the emergence of the High Tech style, and without which British high-tech architecture would have remained where it started – as the pop art   imagery of Archigram, the most influential of the Architectural Association visionary groups.

Background
The history of light-weight, mass-produced, component-based dry construction, which, as a means of assembly differentiates system building from traditional building methods, dates back to the 19th C. It started in the UK with Sir Joseph Paxton's newly created building methods at Chatsworth House's conservatory completed in 1840, and later at The Great Exhibition of 1851, when he used steam-powered woodworking machines to manufacture batches of identical components. At the same time (1829), Henry Robinson Palmer patented corrugated iron, using his invention to construct a shed roof for the London Dock Company the following year.

Progress continued in another industry entirely, the lattice framed trusses required for airships developed by Barnes Wallis at Howden, Yorkshire during his work in the 1920s on the R100 Airship resulted in the development of light weight tubes made from spiral-wound duralumin strip in a helical fashion.

Later, solutions to housing shortage and replacement of other war-decimated facilities required fresh thinking about factory rather than site based building, such as the post-war building of Arcon prefabs in the United Kingdom in large numbers, and of system-built schools such as Consortium of Local Authorities Special Programme CLASP, filtered through to building design in the form of High Tech System Building. Generally, it has been an engineering innovation that has given rise to architectural opportunity.

Between 1961 and 1967 in California, the SCSD (School Construction Systems Development ) project offered architects and educationalists more options than had been available previously - providing greater column-free floor space by using longer spans, and flexible room layouts below. A deep structural zone into which power, H&V, lighting and concertina partition tracks could be accommodated reduced the need for the rigid restrictive planning grids that had hampered the earlier systems.

Further innovations: space frame roof structures derived from WWII aircraft hangar roofs, Rectangular Hollow Section (RHS) (to include Square Hollow Section) steel, known in the US as Hollow Structural Section (HSS) developed in the UK by Stewarts & Lloyds Ltd in the late 1950s and early 1960s, and advances in 'Patent Glazing' during the same period of time, which allowed greater freedom in both wall and roof glazing – presented architects and their clients with near-unlimited flexibility in a building's planning, layout of accommodation and use patterns.

The trend for light weight dry construction also had its roots in military fast-response use, when administration, storage or workshop buildings might be required at short notice. The Nissen hut from WWI, and later the Quonset hut (a derivative of the Nissen design) developed during WWII were both produced in large quantities. However, notwithstanding its origins for military use, light weight design principles were seized upon by American architect and philosopher Richard Buckminster Fuller, who advocated the use of slender or tensile structural components as they would be less wasteful of Earth's scarce resources than would be their bulkier traditional counterparts. His message became something of a creed for the generation of High tech architects. Fuller's designs used well-engineered batch produced components in designs for his renowned Geodesic Domes, although the term 'geodesic' is attributed to Barnes Wallis in his fuselage design for the WWII Lancaster bomber aircraft. German-born Konrad Wachsmann also taught the principles of this type of component-based building design at USC School of Architecture-SAFA.

Proponents of British high-tech architecture
Most architects associated with British high-tech emerged from the Architectural Association; others worked in London at the offices of those that had. Some, like-minded, had come through the offices of modernists such as Ove Arup and Felix Samuely, who believed in 'total design' an earlier term for 'multi-disciplinary' design. In addition, a small group of sympathetic structural engineers, including Frank Newby, Anthony Hunt, Ted Happold, Mark Whitby and Peter Rice, became essential to the development of the movement. As a result of the symbiotic association between architects and engineers, a freedom of design evolved away from the constraints of the everyday. Aside from the architectural and engineering impetus, there was a wider cultural involvement as the principal proponents shared friendships centred upon art, writing and industrial design. Most operated as freelancers working in small studio home offices which became their calling-cards identifying with the High Tech style.

Michael Aukett (1938-2020)                                   
Reyner Banham (1922-1988) Writer and critic
John Batchelor (illustrator) (1936–2019) Technical Illustrator – aircraft and other – Subjects include work by Foster 
Misha Black (1910–1977) Contributor to patronage of 1951 Festival of Britain and to Design Research Unit (DRU)
Hugh Broughton (architect) (b. 1965) Formed Hugh Broughton Architects in 1995
Cuno Brullmann (b. 1945) Worked in association with Piano + Rogers and Ove Arup and Partners
Marcus Brumwell (1901–1977), a founder of Design Research Unit (DRU)
Richard Buckminster Fuller (1895–1983)
Hugh Casson (1910–1999) Director of Architecture for the 1951 Festival of Britain
Warren Chalk (1927–1988) Founding member of Archigram 
Peter Cook (architect) (b. 1936) founding member of Archigram
Dennis Crompton (b. 1935) founding member and archivist of Archigram
Charles and Ray Eames (1907–1978, 1912–1988)
Ezra Ehrenkrantz (1932–2001) architect of the SCSD (School Construction Systems Development) project
Norman Foster (b. 1935) co-founder (1963) of Team 4
Wendy Foster (1937–1989) co-founder (1963) of Team 4
David Greene (architect) (b. 1937) Founding member of Archigram
Nicholas Grimshaw (b. 1939) Grimshaw Architects founded in 1980
Fritz Haller USM Modular Furniture
Ted Happold (1930–1996) Founded Buro Happold in 1976
Ron Herron (1930–1994) Founding member of Archigram
Andrew Holmes (b. 1947)
Michael Hopkins (architect) (b. 1935) Former partner at Foster Associates, set up Michael Hopkins Architects in 1976
Patty Hopkins (b. 1942) Cofounder of Michael Hopkins Architects in 1976, completed Hopkins House, Hampstead in the same year
Richard Horden (1944–2018)
John Howard (architect)
Anthony Hunt (b. 1932) Formed Anthony Hunt Associates in 1962
Ben Johnson (artist) (b. 1946) Subjects include architectural works by Foster and Rogers
Jan Kaplický (1937–2009) Drawings of Neo futuristic Architecture
Ian Liddell (b. 1938)
Syd Mead (1933–2019) Artist specialising in Neo futuristic imagery – subjects include concept work for1982 movie Blade Runner
Max Mengeringenhausen, Founder (1948) of Mero Structures now named Mero-Schmidlin
John Miller (b. c1930) Formed partnership with Alan Colquhoun in 1961
Hidalgo Moya (1920–1994) Formed partnership with Philip Powell (architect) in 1948
Edric Neel (1914–1952) Through Arcon sought better links between architects and industry
Brendan Neiland (artist) (b. 1941) Subjects include architectural works by Grimshaw and Rogers
Frank Newby (1926–2001)
Constant Nieuwenhuys (1920–2005)
David Nixon (architect) (b. 1947) Future Systems 1979 founded by Kaplický and Nixon while working at Foster Associates
Frei Otto (1925-2015)
Renzo Piano (b.1937) Formed partnership Piano + Rogers in 1971
Jean Prouvé (1901-1984)
Cedric Price (1934–2003)  "Unconventional and visionary architect best-known for buildings which never saw the light of day"
Peter Rice (1935–1992) Joined Ove Arup & Partners in 1956
Ian Ritchie (architect) (b. 1947) Worked for Foster Associates and with Hopkins/Hunt on SSSALU (short span structures in aluminium)
Richard Rogers (1933-2021) Co-founder (1963) of Team 4 Partnership with Piano before founding Richard Rogers 
Su Rogers (b. 1939) Co-founder (1963) of Team 4 Partner in Miller & Colquhoun Architects later John Miller & Partners
Walter Segal (1907–1985) Pioneer of self-build housing to the Segal self-build method
Rod Sheard (b. 1951) In 1998 Sheard's firm LOBB Sports Architecture (formerly Howard V Lobb & Partners) merged with HOK Sport.
Alison and Peter Smithson (1928-1993) and (1923-2003) Pioneers of Industrial Aesthetic
Basil Spence (1907-1976) Designer of bolt-together pavilion for Festival of Britain
Colin Stansfield Smith (1932-2013) Hampshire County Architect and Patron
Ralph Tubbs (1912–1996) Designer of bolt-together pavilion for Festival of Britain
Konrad Wachsmann (1901–1980) 
Derek Walker (1929–2015) Architect and Patron for Milton Keynes Development Corporation
Michael Webb (architect) (b. 1937) Co-founder of Archigram
Mark Whitby (b. 1950) Worked, early in his career, for Anthony Hunt Associates and Buro Happold
John Winter (architect) (1930–2012) Writer and critic
Georgina Wolton (-2021)

Noteworthy architectural practices

Powell & Moya (architectural practice formed 1948)
Howard V Lobb & Partners (architectural practice formed 1950) merged with HOK (firm) (architectural practice founded 1955) renamed Populous (architectural practice renamed 2009)
Building Design Partnership (BDP) (architectural practice founded 1961)
Williamson Faulkner Brown (architectural practice) now named FaulknerBrowns Architects (architectural practice from 2013)
Gillinson Barnett & Partners (architectural practice formed 1970) now named Barnett & Partners (architectural practice)

Contemporary imagery
In the austere post World War II Britain, illustrations associated with the comic-book heroes, science fiction writing, aircraft and aerospace industries and military hardware such as the Bailey Bridge provided inspirational imagery for the British High Tech architects.

Furthermore, in 1951, the Festival of Britain intended to lift the spirits of the nation following the austerity of WWII, brought together under the architectural Directorship of Hugh Casson a group of leading architects and engineers to create a series of mainly temporary exhibition buildings located primarily on South Bank area of London.

Most of all in 1969, Apollo 11 and its Lunar Module pointed the way towards light weight exoskeletal transient structures free from conventional building limitations. Science Fiction images from Paolo Soleri, Georgii Krutikov, Buckminster Fuller, Robert McCall, Syd Mead, and, of significance, British author Arthur C. Clarke, (who in 1948 wrote the short story, first published in 1951, "Sentinel of Eternity", which was used as a starting point for the 1968 novel and film 2001: A Space Odyssey), provided a rich source of inspiration for the High Tech movement.

High Tech Buildings for leisure
Wide span column-free dome, cuboid and pyramid shaped building envelopes provided flexibility for internal layout and use patterns. Dutch architect Constant Nieuwenhuys in New Babylon, his long work including drawings and writings of 1959–1974 (not yet called High Tech), foresaw a fictitious world in which the pursuit of pleasure and play, rather than work, had become the mainstay of everyday life for the élite of society.

UK Local Authorities in the 1970s, both at seaside locations and as a part of urban regeneration initiatives, sought to recreate the fun attractions of sun-bathing and swimming in artificially-created waves. Out-of-London UK architects Gillinson Barnett & Partners (Leeds), and Williamson Faulkner Brown Architects (Newcastle upon Tyne) were leaders in this form of design with schemes including Summerland in the Isle of Man (destroyed by fire two years after opening), Sun Centre Rhyl North Wales (now demolished), Oasis Leisure Centre Swindon, and Bletchley Leisure Centre in Milton Keynes (now demolished). Only the Oasis Leisure Centre remains as an example of this building type, although it is itself presently under threat of demolition.

Industrial aesthetic (US also esthetic)
Factory-finished components, brought to site and bolted together, provided uniformity in appearance and standardisation which would allow components to be replaced or reconfigured. Typical of this design trend was the use of a Braithwaite water tank by the Smithsons in their designs for Hunstanton Secondary Modern School in Norfolk UK.

Industrialisation
Industrial components, batch-produced in factories using newly invented materials or new manufacturing processes allowed the construction/assembly of High Tech buildings to move forward.

Technology transfer

Using 'component-based, light weight, factory-finished using standardised interchangeable highly engineered parts' as a template for High Tech Building, in due course technologies developed in allied industries such as boatbuilding, vehicle manufacture or cold storage were transferred to British High Tech architecture.

Selected works and projects

Use of computer-aided design

The use of computer-aided design (CAD) for 3D modelling, and therefore as a basic tool for architectural design, emerged during the 1990s Prior to that date, CAD had been used to a limited extent in structural analysis and as a means of managing and recording traditional drawings. 1983 saw the first 2D Autocad software designed for PC use. Earlier (c1975), "the architects (Gillinson Barnett & Partners) had to devise a computer programme to deal with the large number of components (in the Oasis Leisure Centre Dome roof, Swindon), and the ‘frame analysis’ was reportedly handled by a NASA computer at Houston". In c.1984, Ove Arup and Partners produced computer-generated 3D modelling of the Schlumberger Gould Research Centre, Cambridge, roof membrane.

With the widespread advance of IT, (the use of computers to store or retrieve data) CAD quickly became the essential tool of architectural and engineering design. Anthony Hunt is on record as saying: "... that it was only possible to design and construct the huge biodomes of the Eden Project... because of advances made in computer modelling techniques".

Equality of opportunity

In the Sex Discrimination Act 1975, which led the way to establishment of the Equal Opportunities Commission (United Kingdom), parity between men and women in pay and opportunity became enshrined in law. This coincided with a group of women such as Alison Smithson, Wendy Foster, Su Rogers, Georgina Wolton and Patty Hopkins establishing themselves as equals in what had been up until then a predominately male-oriented profession.

The post mid 1980s reversion to technological modernism

The mid 1980s saw not only the damning "is like a monstrous carbuncle on the face of a much-loved and elegant friend" speech by HRH Charles Prince of Wales, but also the death of several key proponents of British High Tech architecture – amongst which were Buckminster Fuller (1983), Jean Prouvé (1984), Walter Segal (1985) and Reyner Banham (1988), each of whom were significant for their teachings as well as for their building designs.

Use of high-tech methodology for sports stadia

Following the Taylor Report, a Home Office report, the result of a public inquiry into "The Hillsborough Stadium Disaster 15 April 1989", recommendations were such that a new generation of all-seater football stadia became the norm for top division football clubs in the UK. Architects the Lobb Partnership (formerly Howard V Lobb & Partners) in conjunction with The Sports Council promoted designs for "A Stadium for the Nineties" giving rise to a new generation of UK football grounds, the first of which was Kirklees Stadium Huddersfield. Rod Sheard, Principal of Lobb Partnership (later known as Lobb Sports Architecture) designed a series of sports venues using High Tech methodology such as retractable roofs and flamboyant exposed steel structures.

Sustainability

As an adjunct to Richard Buckminster Fuller's question "How much does your building weigh?", that expressed his philosophy of light weight building which in turn reduced wastefulness and therefore conserved Earth's precious resources, he backed up this concept with his Dymaxion Map launched as "World Game: a unique experiment to develop a computer coordinated model of planet earth to research world resources and develop ways of running the future for the benefit of mankind".

The Legacy of British High Tech

In both the worlds of science fiction, space travel and in areas of extreme climatic conditions on Earth, the imagery of British High Tech architecture endures in real projects as well as those imagined. A series of buildings and design competition entries for the Halley Research Station at Halley Bay, Antarctica and Ski Haus by Richard Horden/Anthony Hunt derive solutions for extremes of climate from High Tech imagery. David Nixon promotes similar interests "Design, Construction and Operation of Buildings and Habitats in Extreme Environments" and in "a book entitled 'Architecture of the International Space Station' – the first book to examine the Station from an architectural viewpoint" Hugh Broughton, one of the world's leading designers of polar research facilities including Halley VI, takes the High Tech concept further with designs for 'Building a Martian House' – an exhibition in Bristol led by local artists Ella Good and Nicki Kent.

In 2015 Foster + Partners were shortlisted finalists for the 3D Printed Habitat Challenge, organized by America Makes and NASA – submitting designs for a Mars settlement. Concept art for The Martian (2015) Steve Burg supposes accommodation modules on supporting legs (stilts) reminiscent of their light weight component-based bolt-together counterparts of the 1970s and 1980s such as the Rogers' Zip-Up House designed between 1967 and 1969 for The House of Today competition, and the aforementioned Hugh Broughton polar research station designs.

Archigram were awarded RIBA Royal Gold Medal in 2002. Other  recipients of this prestigious award relevant to this article are (in reverse date order): Sir Nicholas Grimshaw (2019), Frei Otto (2005), Michael and Patricia Hopkins (1994), Peter Rice (1992), Colin Stansfield Smith (1991), Renzo Piano (1989), Sir Richard Rogers (1985), Sir Norman Foster (1983), Charles and Ray Eames (1979), Powell and Moya (1974) and Buckminster Fuller (1968), demonstrating that the legacy of Proponents of British high-tech architecture has remained at the forefront of architectural pioneering work well into the twenty-first century.

References

High-tech architecture
Prefabricated buildings